Bucculatrix amara is a moth in the  family Bucculatricidae. It was described by Edward Meyrick in 1913. It is found in South Africa.

References

External links 
Natural History Museum Lepidoptera generic names catalog

Endemic moths of South Africa
Bucculatricidae
Moths described in 1913
Taxa named by Edward Meyrick
Moths of Africa